The Theater des Westens (Theatre of the West) is one of the most famous theatres for musicals and operettas in Berlin, Germany, located at  10–12 in Charlottenburg. It was founded in 1895 for plays. The present house was opened in 1896 and dedicated to opera and operetta. Enrico Caruso made his debut in Berlin here, and the Ballets Russes appeared with Anna Pavlova. In the 1930s it was run as the Volkstheater Berlin. After World War II it served as the temporary opera house of Berlin, the Städtische Oper (Municipal Opera). In 1961 it became the first theatre in Germany to show musicals. Since then it has become the "German equivalent of Broadway extravaganzas", putting on plays and musical comedies.

History
The theatre was founded in 1895. The construction of the present building began in 1896, designed by Bernhard Sehring. It was opened on 1 October 1896 with a fairy tale, Holger Drachmann's Tausendundeine Nacht. From 1898 the house was used for opera, from 1908 for operetta. Enrico Caruso's first appearance in Berlin was in 1905 in Theater des Westens. In 1910, Diaghilev's Ballets Russes performed Carnaval on Schumann's music in a choreography by Mikhail Fokine. Anna Pavlova appeared with the Ballets Russes in 1914.

From 1922, the house was again used as an opera house, called "Große Volksoper" (Great People's Opera), under the direction of conductor Leo Blech. Short lived, the opera house closed in 1924. The theatre then showed a mixed program, under frequently changing management. The dancer Mary Wigman and her company were a great success in 1926. Hans Lüppschütz took over, presenting traditional works including Die Fledermaus and Alt Heidelberg along with new productions.

From 1921, the cabaret theatre in the basement  was directed by Trude Hesterberg. Performers included Marlene Dietrich, Curt Bois, Bertolt Brecht, Erich Mühsam and Theo Lingen.

It presented as part of  "" (light entertainment), directed by Karl Jöken and his wife Edith Schollwer. It had to be closed after an air raid in 1944.

Städtische Oper
After World War II the building served as Berlin's opera house called , because the Deutsche Oper Berlin had been destroyed in 1943. On 4 September 1945 it was opened by a performance of Beethoven's Fidelio. The General Manager was Michael Bohnen, succeeded by Heinz Tietjen. Ferenc Fricsay was the Musical Director from 1948 to 1952, singers included Dietrich Fischer-Dieskau, Elisabeth Grümmer, Josef Greindl and Ernst Haefliger. Operas by Werner Egk, Boris Blacher and Luigi Nono were premiered during this time, including Hans Werner Henze's  on 23 September 1956.

Musical

When the opera was moved to a new building in 1961, the Theater des Westens specialised in operettas and the new musical. The opening and first musical production was Loewe's My Fair Lady on 1 October 1961, This first performance of the work in German was conducted by Franz Allers who had already conducted the world premiere, the leading roles were performed by Karin Hübner and Paul Hubschmid.

In 1978, the stage technology was improved. In 1981, a restoration of the interior was begun according to the architectural plans of Bernhard Sehring, the facade was restored in 1988. From 1984, Götz Friedrich was intendant and Helmut Baumann artistic director. They concentrated on musicals and were successful with Guys and Dolls and La Cage aux Folles. In 1988 Friedrich staged Porgy and Bess with an "all black-opera". In a united Germany, the theatre faced strong competition and had difficulties in staging an attractive program.

On 24 September 2002, the Senate of Berlin agreed to sell the theatre to Stage Entertainment, while the ownership of the building itself remained in the city. Renovations which began in January 2003 were estimated to have cost 10 million Euros. On 26 September 2003 the theatre opened again with Les Misérables. Stage Entertainment has no ensemble but presents productions of German and international companies.

Premieres

 Leon Jessel: Die beiden Husaren (1913)
 Jean Gilbert: Die Frau im Hermelin (1919)
 Leon Jessel: Schwalbenhochzeit (1921)
 Eduard Künneke: Die lockende Flamme (1933)
 Walter Goetze: Der goldene Pierrot (1934)
 Werner Egk: Circe (1948)
 Boris Blacher: Ein preußisches Märchen (1952)
 Luigi Nono: Der rote Mantel (1954)
 Max Baumann: Pelleas und Melisande (1954)
 Hans Werner Henze: König Hirsch (1956)
 Oskar Sala: Paean (1960)
 Boris Blacher: Rosamunde Floris (1960)
 Rio Reiser: Robinson 2000 (1967)
 James M. Barrie: Peter Pan (1984)
 : Eins, zwei, drei (1989)
 Jürg Burth / Ulf Dietrich: Blue Jeans (1994)
 : 30–60–90° durchgehend geöffnet  (1999)
 Burkhard Driest:  (2000)
 Konstantin Wecker: Schwejk it easy! (2001)
 Rob Bolland und Ferdi Bolland: 3 Musketiers (2005)
  / :  (2008)

Literature
, Dissertation by Detlef Meyer zu Heringsdorf, published by Deutsche Oper Berlin 1988, 
, published by the Genossenschaft Deutscher Bühnenangehöriger Verlag: Bühnenschriften-Vetriebs-Gesellschaft

References

External links

Theater des Westens Berlin
History of the Opera House Deutsche Oper Berlin
Götz Friedrich ist tot: Ewig hoffend, ewig liebend, Der Tagesspiegel, 13 December 2000 
Intendant geschasst – Spielbetrieb gesichert, Frankfurter Allgemeine Zeitung, 21 August 2001 
Official site
Projektindex Theater des Westens, Architekturmuseum TU Berlin 
Denkmale in Berlin / Theater des Westens und Delphi-Palast List of Monuments in Berlin 
Josephine Baker in Berlin cabaret-berlin.com
Theater des Westens visitberlin.de

Theatres in Berlin
1895 establishments in Germany
Music venues completed in 1896